Claire Aisling Hanna (born 19 June 1980) is an Irish Social Democratic and Labour Party (SDLP) politician from Northern Ireland. In December 2019, she was elected as Member of Parliament (MP) for Belfast South in the House of Commons. Previously, she had been a Member of the Legislative Assembly (MLA) for Belfast South from 2015 until her election to Parliament in 2019.

Early life and education
Hanna was born in Connemara, County Galway, to parents Carmel Hanna and Eamon Hanna. She had two sisters and a brother. Hanna has lived in South Belfast since the age of three. She attended St Bride's Primary and Rathmore Grammar School, both in Belfast. Hanna holds a Bachelors of Science (BSc) with honours in International Relations from the Open University and a master's degree in Law (LLM) from Queen's University Belfast. In 1998, her mother Carmel became a Member of the Northern Ireland Assembly for the SDLP, representing Belfast South until 2010.

Hanna's professional background is in international development, latterly in a policy and education role, and included work in Bangladesh, Haiti and Zambia. She was a campaigns officer for Concern Worldwide from 2005 to 2015.

Political career

Belfast City Council
Hanna was elected to Belfast City Council in 2011, representing the Balmoral ward, winning re-election in 2014. She remained in this role until becoming an MLA in June 2015.

She successfully brought forward a motion to make Belfast City Council the first Living Wage local authority on the island, as well as securing all-party support for her proposal to award the Freedom of Belfast to poet Michael Longley. She initiated a campaign to name the new Greenway bridge after playwright and trade unionist Sam Thompson.

She was replaced by her husband Donal Lyons on Belfast City Council.

Northern Ireland Assembly

Hanna was elected to the Northern Ireland Assembly in June 2015, representing Belfast South, the same constituency in which her mother had previously been elected. She served as vice chair of the Finance Committee, as well as on the Public Accounts Committee and the Environment Committees and chaired the Assembly All Party Groups on International Development and the Arts. Hanna's private member's bill on breastfeeding fell when the Assembly collapsed in early 2017.

Hanna was the first member of the SDLP to express concern about the decision of SDLP Newry councillors to vote to name a play park after IRA hunger striker Raymond McCreesh. During the same period, Hanna was chair of the East Belfast Policing Board and Community Partnership. Her home was attacked in the midst of flag protests in the area.

In February 2019, Hanna resigned the SDLP party whip in protest after the party agreed to form an electoral alliance with Fianna Fáil, stating that she would "never become a Fianna Fáil MLA". Hanna had herself been more closely associated with the Irish Labour Party, and had canvassed in support of them in the past.

House of Commons
At the 2019 general election, she became the MP for Belfast South, capturing the seat from the incumbent, Emma Little-Pengelly of the DUP. However, Hanna caused controversy when she affirmed allegiance to the Queen, and then lodged a "respectful protest" against her pledge the following day.

Personal life 
She married Belfast SDLP councillor Donal Lyons in 2011; the couple have three daughters. Hanna lists her recreations as "theatre, reading, running, listening to music, art".

References

External links

1980 births
Living people
Politicians from Belfast
Social Democratic and Labour Party MLAs
Northern Ireland MLAs 2011–2016
Northern Ireland MLAs 2016–2017
Northern Ireland MLAs 2017–2022
Female members of the Northern Ireland Assembly
UK MPs 2019–present
21st-century women politicians from Northern Ireland
Alumni of the Open University
Alumni of Queen's University Belfast
Politicians from County Galway
Social Democratic and Labour Party MPs (UK)
Members of the Parliament of the United Kingdom for Belfast constituencies (since 1922)
Female members of the Parliament of the United Kingdom for Northern Irish constituencies